The 1876 City of Auckland West by-election was a by-election held  on 25 July 1876 in the  electorate during the 6th New Zealand Parliament. It was then a two-member electorate.

The by-election was caused by the resignation of the incumbent, George Grey.

Benjamin Tonks, the Mayor of Auckland City, was elected by a large majority.

Result
The following table gives the election result:

References 

Auckland West 1876
1876 elections in New Zealand
July 1876 events
Politics of the Auckland Region